Pseudathrips is a genus of moth in the family Gelechiidae.

Species
 Pseudathrips amseli (Povolný, 1981)
 Pseudathrips buettikeri Povolný, 1986
 Pseudathrips similis (Povolný, 1981)

References

Gelechiinae